The Street Parade is with over 1 Million visitors the most attended technoparade in the world, since the end of Love Parade 2010. It takes place in Zurich, Switzerland and is the largest annual event in Zurich. Officially a demonstration for freedom, love and tolerance attended by up to a one million people, it proceeds along the side of Lake Zurich on the second Saturday of August.

History
1992 — participants: 1,000The first Street Parade (the English name is used in German) took place on September 5, 1992, initiated by student Marek Krynski and officially called the Demonstration for Love, Peace, Liberty, Generosity and Tolerance. About 1,000 took part in dancing behind two Lovemobiles.

1993 — participants: 10,000 — temp: 27 °CIn only its second year, 10,000 ravers participated.
1994 — participants: 20,000The parade was nearly banned by the head of the police department Robert Neukomm (Socialist Party) and Monika Stocker (Green Party), but strong protests from the media, the population and the techno music scene forced the city to back down. Since then the parade takes place every August with a lengthened route around the corner of Lake Zurich. The first compilation was published that year: Energy 94 Streetparade - The Disc.
1995 — participants: 150,000 — temp: 24 °CAs many as 150,000 Swiss and foreign ravers come to the Street Parade. The double-disc Street Parade 95 is the first dedicated release.
1996 — participants: 350,000 — motto: The Rave-olution continuesFor the first time, the Street Parade is organized by its own dedicated Association, founded by Marek Krynski, Barbara Suter and Christoph Soltmannowski. The official logo of the Street Parade is conceived: a stylized "P" inside a rounded red star.
1997 — participants: 475,000 — temp: 27 °C — motto: Climb & Dance
1998 — participants: 450,000 — temp: 28 °C — motto: It's All In Your HandsThe Street Parade can be first heard in a live CD, directly recorded on a Lovemobile. As music plays, the crowds are heard cheering and celebrating in the background. In this way the disc uniquely portrays the voice of the Street Parade.
1999 — participants: 550,000 — temp: 30 °C — motto: More than WordsRadio Street Parade goes on the air for about two weeks prior to and about a week following the Street Parade. Radio Street Parade broadcasts techno music, electronica and dance, interviews with DJs and musicians as well as reports about the Street Parade.
2000 — participants: 750,000 — temp: 32 °C — motto: Believe in LoveThe Street Parade is for the first time broadcast live on Swiss television SF1, 3sat and Tele 24. The German music television VIVA showed two-hour summaries in the following week.
2001 — participants: 1,000,000 — temp: 21 °C — motto: Love, Freedom, ToleranceThe event reaches record heights with one million participating ravers. The Zurich Street Parade came out of the shadow of the Berlin Love Parade.
2002 — participants: 650,000 — temp: 17 °C — motto: Peace!Rain dampens success of the event.
2003 — participants: 900,000 — temp: 37 °C — motto: Let the Sun ShineVery hot weather with partly clouded sky. Attendance slightly down to an estimated 900,000. However, this contrasts to far more drastic declines in the Berlin event. The direction of the route was reversed in this year in order to reduce noise levels on certain streets, and to provide better exits for the trucks.
2004 — participants: 1,000,000 — temp: 37 °C — motto: Elements of CultureThe Street Parade again reaches a 1,000,000-person count.
2005 — participants: 1,000,000 — temp: 23 °C — motto: Today is TomorrowA million ravers and visitors are officially cited once again. The Street Parade Radio ran into some financial difficulties, but was rescued by the Zurich local radio station Energy Zürich and the free newspaper 20 Minuten. Beer was for the first time available at official drink stands. It was perceived by many that the Street Parade took on a more aggressive tone than before.
2006 — participants: 800,000 — temp: 17 °C — motto: Move Your Mind
2007 — participants: 800,000 — temp: 23 °C — motto: RespectThe Street Parade attracts 800,000 people despite the bad weather forecast.
2008 — participants: 820,000 — temp: 24 °C — motto: Friendship
2009 — participants: 600,000 — temp: 19 °C — motto: Still have a Dream
2010 — participants: 650,000 — temp: 22 °C — motto: Celebrate the Spirit of Street Parade
2011 — participants: 900,000 — temp: 28 °C — motto: 20 Years Love, Freedom, Tolerance & Respect
2012 — participants: 950,000 — temp: 24 °C — motto: Follow your Heart
 2013 — participants: 950,000 — temp: 25 °C — motto: Dance for Freedom
 2014 — participants: 950,000 — temp: 25 °C — motto: Enjoy the Dancefloor - and save it!
 2015 — participants: 1'000,000 — temp: 32 °C — motto: Magic Moments
 2016 — participants: 1'000,000 — temp: 26 °C — motto: Zurich is unique

Organization
Since 1996, the event is organized by the Verein Street Parade (Street Parade Association). Today, the Street Parade has all the character of a popular festival, however legally it is still a political demonstration. This frees the organisation of security costs, among all else that the city takes under its charge.

Notable DJs
Carl Cox, David Morales, Sven Väth, Chris Liebing, Loco Dice, Michel von Tell, DJ Energy, Felix Kröcher, DJ Hell, Mind Against, DJ Antoine, Dr. Motte, Steve Lawler, Tom Novy.

Political aspects
According to the official website,  "The Street Parade is still a demonstration that calls on everyone to live together in peace and tolerance."

Alternatives
Since 1996 the counterparade Antiparade takes place in Zurich on the same day as the Street Parade to provide an alternative to it. Similar to the Fuckparade in Berlin, the goal of this smaller technoparade is to demonstrate against the increasing commercialisation of club culture.

Gallery

See also

List of electronic music festivals
List of technoparades

References

This article is based on the article Street Parade in the German-language Wikipedia.

External links

 Official Website
 Friends of the Street Parade
 The photographic book on Lake & Street Parades by Claudio Bonavolta; 35 pages of the book are available online.

Technoparade
Tourist attractions in Zürich
Electronic music festivals in Switzerland
Free parties
Music festivals established in 1992
Summer events in Switzerland